Colombia competed at the 2020 Winter Youth Olympics in Lausanne, Switzerland from 10 to 22 January 2020. They competed with 2 athletes in 2 sports.

Diego Amaya won the silver medal in the boys' mass start speed skating. This was the first time in history that an athlete from a tropical nation and a Latin American won a medal at an Olympic winter event.

Medalists
Medals awarded to participants of mixed-NOC teams are represented in italics. These medals are not counted towards the individual NOC medal tally.

Bobsleigh

Speed skating

Colombia qualified one male speed skater.

Boys

Mass Start

Mixed

See also

Colombia at the 2020 Summer Olympics

References

Nations at the 2020 Winter Youth Olympics
Colombia at the Youth Olympics
2020 in Colombian sport